Shuyukh Fawqani is a town in northeastern Aleppo Governorate, northern Syria.

Syrian Civil War

On 6 March 2015, following the Kurdish retaking of Kobanî, ISIL blew up the western side of al-Nasiriyyah Bridge, a modern road bridge that had previously been damaged by artillery on 10 February 2014.

References

Populated places on the Euphrates River